Docks and sorrels (Rumex species) are used as food plants by the larvae of a number of Lepidoptera species, including:

Monophagous
Species which feed exclusively on Rumex

 Nepticulidae
Enteucha acetosae - feeds on sheep's sorrel (R. acetosella) and common sorrel (R. acetosa)
 Coleophoridae
Coleophora hydrolapathella - feeds on great water dock (R. hydrolapathum)
 Gelechiidae
Chionodes ochreostrigella

Polyphagous
Species which feed on Rumex and other plants

 Arctiidae
Buff ermine (Spilosoma luteum)
 Gelechiidae
Chionodes discoocellella
 Geometridae
Blood-vein (Timandra griseata)
Common marbled carpet (Chloroclysta truncata)
Engrailed (Ectropis crepuscularia)
Gem (Orthonama obstipata subfamily Larentiinae)
Lime-speck pug (Eupithecia centaureata)
Mottled beauty (Alcis repandata)
 Gracillariidae
Calybites phasianipennella
 Hepialidae
Ghost moth (Hepialus humuli)
Orange swift (Triodia sylvina)
 Lymantriidae
Brown-tail (Euproctis chrysorrhoea)
 Noctuidae
Angle shades (Phlogophora meticulosa)
Autumnal rustic (Eugnorisma glareosa)
Cabbage moth (Mamestra brassicae)
Double square-spot (Xestia triangulum)
Flame (Axylia putris)
Flame shoulder (Ochropleura plecta)
Grey chi (Antitype chi)
Heart and club (Agrotis clavis)
Heart and dart (Agrotis exclamationis)
Hebrew character (Orthosia gothica)
Ingrailed clay (Diarsia mendica)
Lesser broad-bordered yellow underwing (Noctua janthina)
Lesser yellow underwing (Noctua comes)
Mouse moth (Amphipyra tragopoginis)
Setaceous Hebrew character (Xestia c-nigrum)
Six-striped rustic (Xestia sexstrigata)
Turnip moth (Agrotis segetum)
 Saturniidae
Emperor moth (Pavonia pavonia)

References

External links 

Rumex
+Lepidoptera